The 2010 Horizon Laser Vision Center Classic was held from October 1 to October 4 at the Tartan Curling Club in Regina, Saskatchewan. The cash purse of the event was CAD$16,000. The event was held in a round-robin format.

In an all-Saskatchewan final, Randy Bryden defeated Carl deConinck Smith in an extra end, 5–4.

Teams

Round robin

Standings

Results

Draw 1
Friday, October 1, 4:30pm

Draw 2
Friday, October 1, 8:00pm

Draw 3
Saturday, October 2, 10:30am

Draw 4
Saturday, October 2, 3:30pm

Draw 5
Saturday, October 2, 7:30pm

Draw 6
Sunday, October 3, 10:00am

Draw 7
Sunday, October 3, 1:30pm

Draw 8
Sunday, October 3, 5:00pm

Tiebreaker
Sunday, October 3, 8:00pm

Playoffs

Quarterfinals
Monday, October 4, 10:00am

Semifinals
Monday, October 4, 1:00pm

Final
Monday, October 4, 4:00pm

External links

Horizon Laser Vision Center Classic
Sports competitions in Regina, Saskatchewan
Curling in Saskatchewan
Horizon Laser Vision Center Classic
Horizon Laser Vision Center Classic